Mogorče is a village in the municipality of Debar, North Macedonia.
It has traditionally been identified as a Mijak village.

Demographics
Mogorče has traditionally been inhabited by Orthodox Macedonians and a Muslim Macedonian (Torbeš) population.

According to the 2002 census, the village had a total of 1794 inhabitants. Ethnic groups in the village include:

Macedonians 1408
Turks 376
Albanians 1
Bosniaks 1
Romani 1
Others 7

References

External links

Villages in Debar Municipality
Macedonian Muslim villages